Land clearing in Australia describes the removal of native vegetation and deforestation in Australia. Land clearing involves the removal of native vegetation and habitats, including the bulldozing of native bushlands, forests, savannah, woodlands and native grasslands and the draining of natural wetlands for replacement with agriculture, urban and other land uses.

, of the vegetation which existed in Australia at the time of European settlement, approximately 87% remains. One estimate places the rate of rainforest of all types has been reduced by three quarters since the time of European settlement from eight million hectares to two million.  Land clearing threatens native species including ground orchids and eucalyptus.

Land clearing is an important environmental issue in Australia.  Bans on land clearing have been placed by state governments.  This policy largely permitted Australia to abide by its commitments to the Kyoto Protocol.

Causes 

The underlying causes of land-clearing are generally agreed upon.  These are agricultural expansion, infrastructure extension, wood extraction and urban development.

Agriculture 

The primary motivator for land clearing in Australia is agricultural production, especially livestock. Where soil fertility and rainfall allow, the clearing of land allows for increased agricultural production and increase in land values. Land clearing was seen as progressive, and there was the general view that land was wasted unless it was developed.

Historically, land clearing has been supported by the Commonwealth and State Governments as an essential part of improved productivity essential for national economic prosperity. A range of institutional incentives for agriculture increased the economic gain from land clearing, with offerings of cheap land along with venture capital in the form of loans or tax concessions. Other incentives included the War Service Land Settlement Scheme, low-interest bank loans and financial support programs such as drought relief assistance.

The majority of cleared land in Australia has been developed for cattle, sheep and wheat production. 46.3% of Australia is used for cattle grazing on marginal semi-deserts with natural vegetation. This land is too dry and infertile for any other agricultural use (apart from some kangaroo culling). Some of this grazing land has been cleared of "woody scrub". 15% of Australia is currently in use for all other agriculture and forestry purposes on mostly cleared land. In New South Wales, much of the remaining forests and woodlands have been cleared, due to the high productivity of the land. Urban development is also the cause of some land clearing, though not a major driver. In The Australian Capital Territory for example, much urban development has occurred on previously cleared agricultural land.

In Tasmania, land clearing is pushed by agricultural factors because native forest logging has declined the area of land it reclears.

Bushfires in Australia 

Bushfires in Australia are frequently occurring events during the hotter months of the year.

Effects 

Land clearing destroys plants and local ecosystems and removes the food and habitat on which other native species rely. Clearing allows weeds and invasive animals to spread, affects greenhouse gas emissions and can lead to soil degradation, such as erosion and salinity, which in turn can affect water quality.

The following table shows the native vegetation inventory assessment of native vegetation by type prior to European settlement and as at 2001–2004. (Given in units of square kilometres)

Land condition

As the land cover is crucial to land condition, land clearing exerts significant pressure on land condition. Removal of vegetation also leaves soil bare and vulnerable to erosion. Soil stability is essential to avoid land degradation.

Soil erosion

Soil erosion is very significant pressure on land condition because it undermines existing vegetation and habitats and inhibits vegetation and other biotas that inhabit the vegetation from re-establishing, thus resulting in a "negative" feedback loop. Terrestrial vegetation is a source of nutrient replenishment for soils. If vegetation is removed, there is less biological matter available to break down and replenish the nutrients in the soil. Exposing soil to erosion leads to further nutrient depletion. Soil erosion from deforested land has also affected the water quality around the Great Barrier Reef.

Salinity

Another consequence of land clearing is dryland salinity. Dryland salinity is the movement of salt to the land surface via groundwater. In Australia, there are vast amounts of salt stored beneath the land surface. Much of Australian native vegetation has adapted to low rainfall conditions, and use deep root systems to take advantage of any available water beneath the surface. These help to store salt in the earth, by keeping groundwater levels low enough so that salt is not pushed to the surface. However, with land clearing, the reduced amount of water that previously got pumped up by the roots of the trees means that the water table rises towards the surface, dissolving salt in the process. Salinity reduces plant productivity and affects the health of rivers and streams. Salinity also affects the lifespan of roads and other infrastructure, affecting the economy and transportation.

Biodiversity
The extinction of 108 different species (2 mammal, 9 bird and 97 plant species) has been partially attributed to land clearing. While the land condition is one indicator of the pressure of vegetation removal, the health and resilience of the vegetation that remains is also largely dependent on the size of the fragments and their distance from each other. This is also true for species living within these habitat fragments. The smaller and more isolated the remnants, the greater the threat from external pressures as their boundaries (or edges) are more exposed to disturbances. Pressure also increases with the distance between fragments.

Climate change

Land clearing is a major source of Australia's greenhouse gas emissions, contributing approximately 12 per cent to Australia's total emissions in 1998. The removal of vegetation damages the microclimate by removing shade and reducing humidity. It also contributes to global climate change by diminishing the capacity of the vegetation to absorb carbon dioxide. Land clearing could also be responsible for reduced rainfall levels & possible desertification of land as well as soil erosion.

Deforestation and climate extremes

An organisation checked the impacts on climate extremes and droughts by analysing daily rainfall and surface temperature output from the Mark 3 GCM.

This work, the first of its kind, demonstrated an increase in the number of dry days (<1mm rainfall) and hot days (maximum temperature >35 °C), a decrease in daily rainfall intensity and cumulative rainfall on rain days, and an increase in duration of droughts under modified land-cover conditions. These changes were statistically significant for all years across eastern Australia and especially pronounced during strong El Niño events.

These studies have demonstrated that LCC has exacerbated the mean climate anomaly and climate extremes in the southwest and eastern Australia, thus resulting in longer-lasting and more severe droughts.

Response
Since the 1980s, the rate of land clearing has declined due to changing attitudes and greater awareness of the damaging effects of the clearing. The Queensland and New South Wales governments implemented bans on land clearing during the 1990s and early 2000s.  Australia remains a deforestation front, the only developed nation to do so.

Both Queensland and New South Wales monitor land clearing on an annual basis using satellite imagery under the Statewide Landcover and Trees Study.

Regulation of clearing
Clearing is now controlled by legislation in Western Australia, South Australia, Victoria, New South Wales, and to a lesser degree in Queensland. Land clearing controls differ substantially between jurisdictions, and despite growing awareness of the effect of land degradation, controls on clearing have been generally opposed by farmers.

Federal legislation
Land clearing is controlled indirectly by federal law in the form of the Environment Protection and Biodiversity Conservation Act 1999 (Cth), which may also apply if there are federally protected threatened species (plant or animal) or endangered ecological communities present on the land in question.

Fire controls 
Depending on the proximity to high risk bush fire zones in each state, the 10/30 rule or the 10/50 rule might apply. This allows the clearing of trees within 10 meters of homes or clearing undergrowth within 30 or 50 meters of home. This reduces fuel for fire near homes which has proven effective since implementation.

New South Wales
Clearing of native vegetation in NSW is regulated by the Local Land Services Act 2013 (NSW) and by the protections on the habitat of threatened species contained in the Biodiversity Conservation Act 2016 (NSW). It is also regulated by development control and Environmental Planning Instruments (EPIs) under land use planning law, namely the Environmental Planning and Assessment Act 1979 (NSW). Federal law in the form of the Environment Protection and Biodiversity Conservation Act 1999 (Cth) may also apply if there are federally protected threatened species (plant or animal) or endangered ecological communities present on the land in question. Exempt species are outlined in the Biosecurity Act 2015 and can be cleared by property owners at any time.

According to the state government the state lost 54,000 hectares of woody vegetation in 2019.

Queensland
Clearing of native vegetation in Queensland is principally regulated by the Vegetation Management Act 1999 and the Vegetation Management (Regrowth Clearing Moratorium) Act 2009. The Federal EPBC Act may also apply (see above)

Clearing rates in Queensland declined from peaks in the 1990s, after a successful campaign from conservation groups and communities throughout Queensland.

South Australia

Clearing of native vegetation in SA is principally regulated by the Native Vegetation Act 1991 (SA). The Federal EPBC Act may also apply (see above).

Local councils 
In urban areas or cities, tree removal is governed by local council laws outlined in what's called a Tree Preservation Order (TPO). This set of laws is more specific to reflect the localized objectives for urban forest retention by the council. Common objectives include creating healthier ecosystems, improving biodiversity and mitigating the heat island effect through tree retention and scheduled tree planting programs. TPO's will typically include a significant tree register which lists individual or groups of protected trees and their locations which cannot be removed under any circumstances. TPO's also come with exemptions which allow property owners to remove trees without prior approval. Exemptions may include the maximum height and spread of trees that need council consent for removal and a list of exempt species that can be removed irrespective of height and spread.

See also

Deforestation in Victoria
Campaign to Save Native Forests
Clearcutting
Conservation in Australia
Illegal logging in Australia
Logging in the Toolangi State Forest
Logging in the Wielangta Forest
Woodchipping in Australia

References

Notes
Australian Conservation Foundation 2007,  Viewed 26 October 2007.
Australian Greenhouse Office 2000, Land Clearing: A Social History, Commonwealth of Australia, Canberra. Accessed on  29 October 2007.
Benson, J.S 1991, The effect of 200 years of European settlement on the vegetation and flora of New South Wales, Cunninghamia, 2:343-370.
Cogger, H, Ford, H, Johnson, C, Holman, J and Butler, D 2003, Impacts of Land Clearing on Australian Wildlife in Queensland, World Wildlife Foundation Australia, Sydney
Commonwealth Scientific and Industrial Research Organisation (CSIRO) 2007, Land and Water,  https://www.clw.csiro.au/issues/salinity/faq.html  viewed 29 October 2007.
Department of Environment and Water Resources, State of the Environment Report,  viewed 26 October 2007.
Department of the Environment and Heritage 2005, National Vegetation Information System (NVIS) Stage 1, Version 3.0 Major Vegetation Groups, 
 Diamond, Jared, Collapse: How Societies Choose to Fail or Succeed, Penguin Books, 2005 and 2011. See chapter 13 entitled « "Mining" Australia » (pages 378–416).
Giles, D 2007, State's land clearing concern, in The Courier-Mail, 28 October 2007.
National Land and Water Resources Audit, Present Vegetation 1998 in National Land and Water Resources Audit 2001, Commonwealth of Australia,  viewed 29 October 2007.
Thackway, R & Cresswell, I.D (eds.) 1995, An Interim Biogeographic Regionalization for Australia: A Framework for Setting Priorities in the National Reserves System Cooperative Program, Australian Nature Conservation Agency, Canberra.
The Australian Bureau of Statistics, www.abs.gov.au, viewed 26 October 2007.

Land management in Australia
Environmental issues in Australia